Kostopoulos is a surname meaning "son of Kostas". The feminine form is Kostopoulou (Κωστοπούλου). Notable people with the surname include:

Charis Kostopoulos (born 1964), Greek singer, songwriter, poet, composer 
Evan Kostopoulos (born 1990), Australian footballer
Stavros Kostopoulos (1900–1968), Greek banker and politician
Tom Kostopoulos (born 1979), Canadian professional ice hockey player

Greek-language surnames
Surnames